The Final Scene is the fifth installment in the Nancy Drew point-and-click adventure game series by Her Interactive. The game is available for play on Microsoft Windows platforms. It has an ESRB rating of E for moments of mild violence and peril. Players take on the first-person view of fictional amateur sleuth Nancy Drew and must solve the mystery through interrogation of suspects, solving puzzles, and discovering clues. There are two levels of gameplay, including a Junior and Senior detective mode. Each mode offers a different difficulty level of puzzles and hints, but neither of these changes affect the actual plot of the game. The game is loosely based on a book of the same name, The Final Scene (1989).

Plot
Nancy Drew and her friend Maya Nguyen are at the Royal Palladium theater in St. Louis for the premiere of a new movie Vanishing Destiny. Maya is set to interview the star of the film, Brady Armstrong, for her school's newspaper, but as Maya goes into his dressing room, she is kidnapped. Nancy has to race against time to find Maya and the kidnapper before the theater is demolished in three days.

Development

Characters

Nancy Drew - Nancy is an 18-year-old amateur detective from the fictional town of River Heights in the United States. She is the only playable character in the game, which means the player must solve the mystery from her perspective.
Brady Armstrong - Brady is the star of the movie Vanishing Destiny that Maya intended to interview before she was kidnapped from his dressing room.  Brady's life and appearance are often under the control of his agent Simone. Is Brady worried that his show might not go on after the theater has been demolished?
Simone Mueller - Simone is Brady's self-centered agent who is always on the phone in the women's dressing room. When Maya disappears, she decides to cancel the Vanishing Destiny premiere because she thinks Maya's kidnapping is a great opportunity to drum up more press. Could she have set up the kidnapping as a publicity stunt for Brady?
Joseph Hughes - Joseph is the caretaker of the theater who works in the projector room. He is very open and friendly. Joseph has worked at the Royal Palladium his entire life and is deeply connected to it, but he acts as though he is fine with the demolition. How far would he go to save his beloved theater?
Nicholas Falcone - Nicholas is the leader of "H.A.D I.T" or "Humans Against the Destruction of Illustrious Theaters". They are leading a protest against the demolition of the theater. He acts as if he's innocent and only wants to help, but the police say that he has previously faked a kidnapping to save a theater. Would kidnapping Maya be a means to his end?

Cast
Nancy Drew - Lani Minella
Brady Armstrong / The Amazing Monty - David S. Hogan
Nicholas Falcone / Construction Worker - Max Holechek (as Alan Smythe)
Joseph Hughes / Sergeant Mac Ramsey - Bob Heath
Simone Mueller / Madeline - Keri Healey
Eustacia Andropov - Alena Saunders
Ned Nickerson / Sherman Trout - Scott Carty
Bess Marvin - Punchy LaRue
George Fayne - Maureen Nelson

Reception
According to PC Data, The Final Scene sold 23,557 units in North America during 2001, and another 15,947 units in the first three months of 2002. Its sales in the region for the year 2003 totaled 38,064 units. In the United States alone, the game's computer version sold between 100,000 and 300,000 units by August 2006. Combined sales of the Nancy Drew adventure game series reached 500,000 copies in North America by early 2003, and the computer entries reached 2.1 million sales in the United States alone by August 2006. Remarking upon this success, Edge called Nancy Drew a "powerful franchise".

Charles Herold of The New York Times declared The Final Scene one of the best games of 2001. Praising its characters, he wrote that the game "sticks to the [Nancy Drew] formula but refines and improves it, adding a little suspense, more interesting suspects and sharper dialogue." The Final Scene also received a "Gold" Parents' Choice Award in summer 2002.

References

External links
Official site (archived)

2001 video games
Detective video games
Video games based on Nancy Drew
Video games developed in the United States
Point-and-click adventure games
Video games scored by Kevin Manthei
Video games set in St. Louis
Windows games
Windows-only games
Her Interactive games
Single-player video games
North America-exclusive video games